The English term enlightenment is the Western translation of various Buddhist terms, most notably bodhi and vimutti. The abstract noun bodhi (Sanskrit: बोधि; Pali: bodhi), means the knowledge or wisdom, or awakened intellect, of a Buddha. The verbal root budh- means "to awaken," and its literal meaning is closer to awakening. Although the term buddhi is also used in other Indian philosophies and traditions, its most common usage is in the context of Buddhism. Vimukti is the freedom from or release of the fetters and hindrances.

The term "enlightenment" was popularised in the Western world through the 19th-century translations of German-born philologist Max Müller. It has the Western connotation of general insight into transcendental truth or reality. The term is also being used to translate several other Buddhist terms and concepts, which are used to denote (initial) insight (prajna (Sanskrit), wu (Chinese), kensho and satori (Japanese)); knowledge (vidya); the "blowing out" (Nirvana) of disturbing emotions and desires; and the attainment of supreme Buddhahood (samyak sam bodhi), as exemplified by Gautama Buddha.

What exactly constituted the Buddha's awakening is unknown. It may have involved the knowledge that liberation was attained by the combination of mindfulness and dhyāna, applied to the understanding of the arising and ceasing of craving. The relation between dhyana and insight is a core problem in the study of Buddhism, and is one of the fundamentals of Buddhist practice.

In the Western world, the concept of (spiritual) enlightenment has taken on a romantic meaning. It has become synonymous with self-realization and the true self and false self, being regarded as a substantial essence being covered over by social conditioning.

Etymology
Bodhi, Sanskrit बोधि, "awakening," "perfect knowledge," "perfect knowledge or wisdom (by which a man becomes a बुद्ध [Buddha] or जिन [jina, arahant; "victorious," "victor"], the illuminated or enlightened intellect (of a Buddha or जिन)."

The word Bodhi is an abstract noun, formed from the verbal root *budh-, Sanskrit बुध, "to awaken, to know," "to wake, wake up, be awake," "to recover consciousness (after a swoon)," "to observe, heed, attend to."

It corresponds to the verbs bujjhati (Pāli) and bodhati, बोदति, "become or be aware of, perceive, learn, know, understand, awake" or budhyate (Sanskrit).

The feminine Sanskrit noun of *budh- is बुद्धि, buddhi, "prescience, intuition, perception, point of view."

Translation
Robert S. Cohen notes that the majority of English books on Buddhism use the term "enlightenment" to translate the term bodhi. The root budh, from which both bodhi and Buddha are derived, means "to wake up" or "to recover consciousness". Cohen notes that bodhi is not the result of an illumination, but of a path of realization, or coming to understanding. The term "enlightenment" is event-oriented, whereas the term "awakening" is process-oriented. The western use of the term "enlighten" has Christian roots, as in Calvin's "It is God alone who enlightens our minds to perceive his truths".

Early 19th century bodhi was translated as "intelligence". The term "enlighten" was first being used in 1835, in an English translation of a French article, while the first recorded use of the term 'enlightenment' is credited (by the Oxford English Dictionary) to the Journal of the Asiatic Society of Bengal (February, 1836). In 1857 The Times used the term "the Enlightened" for the Buddha in a short article, which was reprinted the following year by Max Müller. Thereafter, the use of the term subsided, but reappeared with the publication of Max Müller's Chips from a german Workshop, which included a reprint from the Times-article. The book was translated in 1969 into German, using the term "der Erleuchtete". Max Müller was an essentialist, who believed in a natural religion, and saw religion as an inherent capacity of human beings. "Enlightenment" was a means to capture natural religious truths, as distinguished from mere mythology.

By the mid-1870s it had become commonplace to call the Buddha "enlightened", and by the end of the 1880s the terms "enlightened" and "enlightenment" dominated the English literature.

Related terms

Insight

Bodhi

While the Buddhist tradition regards bodhi as referring to full and complete liberation (samyaksambudh), it also has the more modest meaning of  knowing that the path that's being followed leads to the desired goal. According to Johannes Bronkhorst, Tillman Vetter, and K.R. Norman, bodhi was at first not specified. K.R. Norman:

According to Norman, bodhi may basically have meant the knowledge that nibbana was attained, due to the practice of dhyana. Originally only "prajna" may have been mentioned, and Tillman Vetter even concludes that originally dhyana itself was deemed liberating, with the stilling of pleasure or pain in the fourth jhana, not the gaining of some perfect wisdom or insight. Gombrich also argues that the emphasis on insight is a later development.

In Theravada Buddhism, bodhi refers to the realisation of the four stages of enlightenment and becoming an Arahant. In Theravada Buddhism, bodhi is equal to supreme insight, and the realisation of the four noble truths, which leads to deliverance. According to Nyanatiloka,

This equation of bodhi with the four noble truths is a later development, in response to developments within Indian religious thought, where "liberating insight" was deemed essential for liberation. The four noble truths as the liberating insight of the Buddha eventually were superseded by Pratītyasamutpāda, the twelvefold chain of causation, and still later by anatta, the emptiness of the self.

In Mahayana Buddhism, bodhi is equal to prajna, insight into the Buddha-nature, sunyata and tathatā. This is equal to the realisation of the non-duality of absolute and relative.

Prajna

In Theravada Buddhism pannā (Pali) means "understanding", "wisdom", "insight". "Insight" is equivalent to vipassana''', insight into the three marks of existence, namely anicca, dukkha and anatta. Insight leads to the four stages of enlightenment and Nirvana.

In Mahayana Buddhism Prajna (Sanskrit) means "insight" or "wisdom", and entails insight into sunyata. The attainment of this insight is often seen as the attainment of "enlightenment".

Wu, kensho and satoriwu is the Chinese term for initial insight. Kensho and Satori are Japanese terms used in Zen traditions. Kensho means "seeing into one's true nature." Ken means "seeing", sho means "nature", "essence", c.q Buddha-nature. Satori (Japanese) is often used interchangeably with kensho, but refers to the experience of kensho. The Rinzai tradition sees kensho as essential to the attainment of Buddhahood, but considers further practice essential to attain Buddhahood.

East-Asian (Chinese) Buddhism emphasizes insight into Buddha-nature. This term is derived from Indian tathagata-garbha thought, "the womb of the thus-gone" (the Buddha), the inherent potential of every sentient being to become a Buddha. This idea was integrated with the Yogacara-idea of the ālaya vijñāna, and further developed in Chinese Buddhism, which integrated Indian Buddhism with native Chinese thought. Buddha-nature came to mean both the potential of awakening and the whole of reality, a dynamic interpenetration of absolute and relative. In this awakening it is realized that observer and observed are not distinct entities, but mutually co-dependent.

Knowledge
The term vidhya is being used in contrast to avidhya, ignorance or the lack of knowledge, which binds us to samsara. The Mahasaccaka Sutta describes the three knowledges which the Buddha attained:
 Insight into his past lives
 Insight into the workings of Karma and Reincarnation
 Insight into the Four Noble Truths

According to Bronkhorst, the first two knowledges are later additions, while insight into the four truths represents a later development, in response to concurring religious traditions, in which "liberating insight" came to be stressed over the practice of dhyana.

Freedom
Vimukthi, also called moksha, means "freedom", "release", "deliverance". Sometimes a distinction is being made between ceto-vimukthi, "liberation of the mind", and panna-vimukthi, "liberation by understanding". The Buddhist tradition recognises two kinds of ceto-vimukthi, one temporarily and one permanent, the last being equivalent to panna-vimukthi.

Yogacara uses the term āśraya parāvŗtti, "revolution of the basis",

Nirvana
Nirvana is the "blowing out" of disturbing emotions, which is the same as liberation. The usage of the term "enlightenment" to translate "nirvana" was popularized in the 19th century, in part, due to the efforts of Max Muller, who used the term consistently in his translations.

Buddha's awakening

Buddhahood
Three types of buddha are recognized:
 Arhat (Pali: arahant), those who reach Nirvana by following the teachings of the Buddha. Sometimes the term Śrāvakabuddha (Pali: sāvakabuddha) is used to designate this kind of awakened person;
 Pratyekabuddhas (Pali: paccekabuddha), those who reach Nirvana through self-realisation, without the aid of spiritual guides and teachers, but don't teach the Dharma;
 Samyaksambuddha (Pali: samma sambuddha), often simply referred to as Buddha, one who has reached Nirvana by his own efforts and wisdom and teaches it skillfully to others..

Siddhartha Gautama, known as the Buddha, is said to have achieved full awakening, known as samyaksaṃbodhi (Sanskrit; Pāli: sammāsaṃbodhi), "perfect Buddhahood", or anuttarā-samyak-saṃbodhi, "highest perfect awakening". Specifically, anuttarā-samyak-saṃbodhi, literally meaning unsurpassed, complete and perfect enlightenment, is often used to distinguish the enlightenment of a Buddha from that of an Arhat.

The term Buddha has acquired somewhat different meanings in the various Buddhist traditions. An equivalent term for Buddha is Tathāgata, "the thus-gone". The way to Buddhahood is somewhat differently understood in the various Buddhist traditions.

The awakening of the Buddha

Canonical accounts
In the suttapitaka, the Buddhist canon as preserved in the Theravada tradition, a couple of texts can be found in which the Buddha's attainment of liberation forms part of the narrative.

The Ariyapariyesana Sutta (Majjhima Nikaya 26) describes how the Buddha was dissatisfied with the teachings of Āḷāra Kālāma and Uddaka Rāmaputta, wandered further through Magadhan country, and then found "an agreeable piece of ground" which served for striving. The sutta then only says that he attained Nibbana.

In the Vanapattha Sutta (Majjhima Nikaya 17) the Buddha describes life in the jungle, and the attainment of awakening. The Mahasaccaka Sutta (Majjhima Nikaya 36) describes his ascetic practices, which he abandoned. Thereafter he remembered a spontaneous state of jhana, and set out for jhana-practice. Both suttas narrate how, after destroying the disturbances of the mind, and attaining concentration of the mind, he attained three knowledges (vidhya):
 Insight into his past lives
 Insight into the workings of Karma and Reincarnation
 Insight into the Four Noble Truths

Insight into the Four Noble Truths is here called awakening. The monk (bhikkhu) has "...attained the unattained supreme security from bondage." Awakening is also described as synonymous with Nirvana, the extinction of the passions whereby suffering is ended and no more rebirths take place. The insight arises that this liberation is certain: "Knowledge arose in me, and insight: my freedom is certain, this is my last birth, now there is no rebirth."

Critical assessment
Schmithausen notes that the mention of the four noble truths as constituting "liberating insight", which is attained after mastering the Rupa Jhanas, is a later addition to texts such as Majjhima Nikaya 36. Bronkhorst notices that

It calls in question the reliability of these accounts, and the relation between dhyana and insight, which is a core problem in the study of early Buddhism. Originally the term prajna may have been used, which came to be replaced by the four truths in those texts where "liberating insight" was preceded by the four jhanas. Bronkhorst also notices that the conception of what exactly this "liberating insight" was developed throughout time. Whereas originally it may not have been specified, later on the four truths served as such, to be superseded by pratityasamutpada, and still later, in the Hinayana schools, by the doctrine of the non-existence of a substantial self or person. And Schmithausen notices that still other descriptions of this "liberating insight" exist in the Buddhist canon:

An example of this substitution, and its consequences, is Majjhima Nikaya 36:42–43, which gives an account of the awakening of the Buddha.

Understanding of bodhi and Buddhahood
The term bodhi acquired a variety of meanings and connotations during the development of Buddhist thoughts in the various schools.

Early Buddhism

In early Buddhism, bodhi carried a meaning synonymous to nirvana, using only some different metaphors to describe the insight, which implied the extinction of lobha (greed), dosa (hate) and moha (delusion).

Theravada

In Theravada Buddhism, bodhi and nirvana carry the same meaning, that of being freed from greed, hate and delusion. In Theravada Buddhism, bodhi refers to the realisation of the four stages of enlightenment and becoming an Arahant. In Theravada Buddhism, bodhi is equal to supreme insight, the realisation of the four noble truths, which leads to deliverance. Reaching full awakening is equivalent in meaning to reaching Nirvāṇa. Attaining Nirvāṇa is the ultimate goal of Theravada and other śrāvaka traditions. It involves the abandonment of the ten fetters and the cessation of dukkha or suffering. Full awakening is reached in four stages. According to Nyanatiloka,

Since the 1980s, western Theravada-oriented teachers have started to question the primacy of insight. According to Thanissaro Bhikkhu, jhana and vipassana (insight) form an integrated practice. Polak and Arbel, following scholars like Vetter and Bronkhorst, argue that right effort, c.q. the four right efforts (sense restraint, preventing the arising of unwholesome states, and the generation of wholesome states), mindfulness, and dhyana form an integrated practice, in which dhyana is the actualisation of insight, leading to an awakened awareness which is "non-reactive and lucid."

Mahayana

In Mahayana-thought, bodhi is the realisation of the inseparability of samsara and nirvana, and the unity of subject and object. It is similar to prajna, to realizing the Buddha-nature, realizing sunyata and realizing suchness. In time, the Buddha's awakening came to be understood as an immediate full awakening and liberation, instead of the insight into and certainty about the way to follow to reach enlightenment. However, in some Zen traditions this perfection came to be relativized again; according to one contemporary Zen master, "Shakyamuni buddha and Bodhidharma are still practicing."

Mahayana discerns three forms of awakened beings:
 Arahat – Liberation for oneself;
 Bodhisattva – Liberation for living beings;
 Full Buddhahood. 

Within the various Mahayana-schools exist various further explanations and interpretations. In Mahāyāna Buddhism the Bodhisattva is the ideal. The ultimate goal is not only of one's own liberation in Buddhahood, but the liberation of all living beings. But Mahayana Buddhism also developed a cosmology with a wide range of buddhas and bodhisattvas, who assist humans on their way to liberation.

Nichiren Buddhism regards Buddhahood as a state of perfect freedom, in which one is awakened to the eternal and ultimate truth that is the reality of all things. This supreme state of life is characterized by boundless wisdom and infinite compassion. The Lotus Sutra reveals that Buddhahood is a potential in the lives of all beings.

Buddha-nature
In the Tathagatagarbha and Buddha-nature doctrines bodhi becomes equivalent to the universal, natural and pure state of the mind:

According to these doctrines bodhi is always there within one's mind, but requires the defilements to be removed. This vision is expounded in texts such as the Shurangama Sutra and the Uttaratantra.

In Shingon Buddhism, the state of Bodhi is also seen as naturally inherent in the mind. It is the mind's natural and pure state, where no distinction is being made between a perceiving subject and perceived objects. This is also the understanding of Bodhi found in Yogacara Buddhism.

To achieve this vision of non-duality, it is necessary to recognise one's own mind:

Harmonisation of the various terms and meanings in Vajrayana Buddhism
During the development of Mahayana Buddhism the various strands of thought on Bodhi were continuously being elaborated. Attempts were made to harmonize the various terms. The Vajrayana Buddhist commentator Buddhaguhya treats various terms as synonyms:

Western understanding of enlightenment

In the western world the concept of enlightenment has taken on a romantic meaning. It has become synonymous with self-realization and the true self, being regarded as a substantial essence being covered over by social conditioning.

Enlightenment as "Aufklärung"
The use of the western word enlightenment is based on the supposed resemblance of bodhi with Aufklärung, the independent use of reason to gain insight into the true nature of our world. In fact there are more resemblances with Romanticism than with the Enlightenment: the emphasis on feeling, on intuitive insight, on a true essence beyond the world of appearances.

Awakening
The equivalent term "awakening" has also been used in a Christian context, namely the Great Awakenings, several periods of religious revival in American religious history. Historians and theologians identify three or four waves of increased religious enthusiasm occurring between the early 18th century and the late 19th century. Each of these "Great Awakenings" was characterized by widespread revivals led by evangelical Protestant ministers, a sharp increase of interest in religion, a profound sense of conviction and redemption on the part of those affected, an increase in evangelical church membership, and the formation of new religious movements and denominations.

Romanticism and transcendentalism
The romantic idea of enlightenment as insight into a timeless, transcendent reality has been popularized especially by D.T. Suzuki. Further popularization was due to the writings of Heinrich Dumoulin. Dumoulin viewed metaphysics as the expression of a transcendent truth, which according to him was expressed by Mahayana Buddhism, but not by the pragmatic analysis of the oldest Buddhism, which emphasizes anatta. This romantic vision is also recognizable in the works of Ken Wilber.

In the oldest Buddhism this essentialism is not recognizable. According to critics it doesn't really contribute to a real insight into Buddhism:...most of them labour under the old cliché that the goal of Buddhist psychological analysis is to reveal the hidden mysteries in the human mind and thereby facilitate the development of a transcendental state of consciousness beyond the reach of linguistic expression.

Enlightenment and experience
A common reference in western culture is the notion of "enlightenment experience". This notion can be traced back to William James, who used the term "religious experience" in his 1902 book, The Varieties of Religious Experience. Wayne Proudfoot traces the roots of the notion of "religious experience" further back to the German theologian Friedrich Schleiermacher (1768–1834), who argued that religion is based on a feeling of the infinite. Schleiermacher used the notion of "religious experience" to defend religion against the growing scientific and secular critique.

It was popularised by the Transcendentalists, and exported to Asia via missionaries. Transcendentalism developed as a reaction against 18th Century rationalism, John Locke's philosophy of Sensualism, and the predestination of New England Calvinism. It is fundamentally a variety of diverse sources such as Hindu texts like the Vedas, the Upanishads and the Bhagavad Gita, various religions, and German idealism.

It was adopted by many scholars of religion, of which William James was the most influential.

The notion of "experience" has been criticised. Robert Sharf points out that "experience" is a typical western term, which has found its way into Asian religiosity via western influences.

The notion of "experience" introduces a false notion of duality between "experiencer" and "experienced", whereas the essence of kensho is the realisation of the "non-duality" of observer and observed. "Pure experience" does not exist; all experience is mediated by intellectual and cognitive activity. The specific teachings and practices of a specific tradition may even determine what "experience" someone has, which means that this "experience" is not the proof of the teaching, but a result of the teaching. A pure consciousness without concepts, reached by "cleaning the doors of perception" as per romantic poet William Blake, would, according to Mohr, be an overwhelming chaos of sensory input without coherence.

Bodhi Day
Sakyamuni's awakening is celebrated on Bodhi Day. In Sri Lanka and Japan different days are used for this celebration.
According to the Theravada tradition in Sri Lanka, Sakyamuni reached Buddhahood at the full moon in May. This is celebrated at Wesak Poya, the full moon in May, as Sambuddhatva jayanthi (also known as Sambuddha jayanthi).
The Zen tradition claims the Buddha reached his decisive insight on 8 December. This is celebrated in Zen monasteries with a very intensive eight-day session of Rōhatsu.

See also
 Buddhism and psychology
 Buddhist philosophy
 Enlightenment (spiritual)
 Hongaku
 Illuminationism
 Subitism
 Wisdom

Notes

References

Web references

Sources

 

 
 
 
 
 
 

 
 
 
 

 
 
 

 
 

 
 
 
 

 
 
 
 
 
 

 
 
 
 

 
 
 

 
 
 

 
 
 
 
 

 
 

 

 
 
 
 
 
 
 
 
 

 
 

 
 
 
 
 
 

 

Further reading
General
 

Earliest Buddhism
 
 
 

Theravada
 Shankman (2008), The Experience of Samadhi''
 Keren Arbel (2017), Early Buddhist Meditation, Taylor & Francis

Mahayana
 

Zen

External links
 Pali Text Society: Occurrences of the term 'enlightenment'
 Joan Sutherland, What is enlightenment?, Buddhadharma February 16, 2013
 Barbara O'Brien, What is Enlightenment?

Buddhist belief and doctrine
Spirituality
Buddhist stages of enlightenment
Mystical union